Smiler is the fifth studio album by English rock singer-songwriter Rod Stewart. It was released on 4 October 1974 by Mercury Records. It reached number 1 in the UK album chart, and number 13 in the US. The album included covers of Chuck Berry, Sam Cooke and Bob Dylan songs, as well as a duet with Elton John of John's song "Let Me Be Your Car". Stewart also covered Carole King's "(You Make Me Feel Like) A Natural Woman" where 'Woman' is switched to 'Man'. This track was selected for special derision by critics.  The release of the album itself was held up for five months due to legal problems between Mercury Records and Warner Bros. Records.

Musicians appearing on the album included members of Stewart's band Faces, as well as frequent collaborators Martin Quittenton (guitars), Pete Sears (bass & keyboards), and Mickey Waller (drums).

Reception

Track listing

"Sweet Little Rock 'n' Roller" (Chuck Berry) – 3:43
"Lochinvar" (Pete Sears) – 0:25
"Farewell" (Rod Stewart, Martin Quittenton) – 4:34
"Sailor" – (Stewart, Ronnie Wood) 3:35
"Bring It On Home to Me/You Send Me" (Sam Cooke) – 3:57
"Let Me Be Your Car" (Elton John, Bernie Taupin) – 4:56
"(You Make Me Feel Like) A Natural Man" (Gerry Goffin, Carole King, Jerry Wexler) – 3:54
"Dixie Toot" – (Stewart, Ronnie Wood) 3:27
"Hard Road" (Harry Vanda, George Young) – 4:27
"I've Grown Accustomed to Her Face" Instrumental (Alan Jay Lerner, Frederick Loewe) – 1:32
"Girl from the North Country" (Bob Dylan) – 3:52
"Mine for Me" (Paul McCartney, Linda McCartney) – 4:02

A 1991 CD compilation called 'back 2 back – 2 for 1' combined Smiler with Gasoline Alley. However, tracks 2, 9 and 10, were left out on this release.

Personnel
Rod Stewart – vocals
Ronnie Wood – acoustic & electric guitar, bass guitar
Martin Quittenton – acoustic guitar
Spike Heatley, Willie Weeks – bass guitar
Elton John – piano and vocals on "Let Me Be Your Car"
Pete Sears – piano, harpsichord, celeste
Ian McLagan – Hammond organ
Ray Jackson – mandolin
Ric Grech, Dick Powell – violin
The Memphis Horns - horns
Paul McCartney – backing vocals on "Mine for Me"
Irene Chanter – backing vocals
Ray Cooper – percussion
Tropic Isles Steel Band – drums
Micky Waller, Andy Newmark, Kenney Jones – drums
Chris Barber's Jazz Band
Mike Bobak – engineering
Bob Ludwig – mastering

References

1974 albums
Rod Stewart albums
Mercury Records albums
Albums recorded at Morgan Sound Studios